Désiré Doué (born 3 June 2005) is a French professional footballer who plays as a midfielder for Ligue 1 club Rennes.

Club career
Doué began playing football with the youth academy of Rennes at the age of five in 2011. He began his senior career with their reserves in 2021, and started training with the senior side in February 2021. On 14 April 2022, he signed his first professional contract until 2024.

On 7 August 2022, Doué made his professional debut for Rennes as a substitute in a 1–0 Ligue 1 defeat at home to Lorient. On 31 August, he scored his first professional goal in a 3–1 league win at home over Brest. On 6 October, Doué scored an 89th-minute winning goal for Rennes in a 2–1 UEFA Europa League home victory over Dynamo Kyiv, his first European goal.

International career
Born in France, Doué is of Ivorian descent. He is a youth international for France, having represented the France U17s. He played for the U17s in their winning campaign at the 2022 UEFA European Under-17 Championship.

Personal life
Doué's brother Guéla Doué, and his cousins Yann Gboho and Marc-Olivier Doué are also professional footballers.

Honours
France U17
 UEFA European Under-17 Championship: 2022

References

External links
 
 FFF profile

2005 births
Living people
Sportspeople from Angers
French sportspeople of Ivorian descent
French footballers
Association football midfielders
France youth international footballers
Ligue 1 players
Championnat National 3 players
Stade Rennais F.C. players